Sir George Simeon (c.1584 - 4 May 1664) was an English landowner and politician who sat in the House of Commons between 1614 and 1624.

Simeon was the son of John Simeon of  Brightwell Baldwin, Minigrove, Britwell Priory, Chilworth, and Stoke Talmage in Oxfordshire and his wife Anne Molyns, daughter  of Anthony Molyns.  He was knighted in 1604. In  1611 he sold "The Howe" to his brother, later Sir John Simeon. 

In 1614, he was elected Member of Parliament for Wallingford. After entering Gray's Inn in 1616 to study law he was re-elected MP for Wallingford in 1621 and in 1624.

Simeon married  Mary Vaux, daughter of the Hon. George Vaux, eldest son of William Vaux, 3rd Baron Vaux of Harrowden, and had two daughters,  Anne and Elizabeth who married to Edmund Butler, 4th Viscount Mountgarret. Simeon married secondly, Margaret Molyneux, daughter of Sir Richard Molyneux, 1st Baronet of Sefton, Lancashire  and was succeeded by the youngest and only surviving son of five.

References

1580s births
1664 deaths
English landowners
People from Wallingford, Oxfordshire
Members of Gray's Inn
Knights Bachelor
English MPs 1614
English MPs 1621–1622
English MPs 1624–1625